Highway 86 (AR 86, Ark. 86, and Hwy. 86) is a mostly north–south highway in central Arkansas.

Route description

History
Highway 86 was created between Holly Grove and the current eastern terminus at Highway 20 on April 12, 1940. A second segment was created in 1953 between Slovak and Highway 11 in Prairie County. The route was extended over Highway 11 through Tollville on July 10, 1957 and east to Highway 33 on June 29, 1960. On June 23, 1965, the Prairie County section was extended north to the current western terminus at Screeton, and the third section of Highway 86 was designated between Hayley and a county road near Wattensaw Bayou.

The northern  of the Monroe County route was deleted in a swap to add length to Highway 146 on April 27, 1971, leaving the route to terminate at the current county road intersection.

In accordance with the Act, Highway 86 was extended southerly on April 5, 1973.

An earlier Highway 86 was created in the 1926 renumbering from US 71 just south of Gillham southwest to the Oklahoma state line. This route was removed in 1929, and is now known as Bellah Mine Road.

Major intersections
Mile markers reset at some concurrencies.

Former route

Route description

History
Highway 86 was designated as one of the original state highways on April 1, 1926. This segment was deleted after September 1, 1928 and before September 1, 1929.

Major intersections

See also

 List of state highways in Arkansas

Notes

References

External links

086
Transportation in Prairie County, Arkansas
Transportation in Lonoke County, Arkansas
Transportation in Phillips County, Arkansas
086
Transportation in Sevier County, Arkansas